Pajaro Dunes is a census-designated place (CDP) in Santa Cruz County, California. Pajaro Dunes is situated at an elevation of 13 feet (4.0 m) above sea level. The 2020 United States census reported Pajaro Dunes' population was 122.

Geography 
According to the United States Census Bureau, the CDP covers an area of 2.6 square miles (6.7 km), 99.00% of it land and 1.00% of it water.

Demographics 

The 2010 United States Census reported that Pajaro Dunes had a population of 144. The racial makeup of Pajaro Dunes was 92 (63.9%) White, 0 (0.0%) African American, 0 (0.0%) Native American, 6 (4.2%) Asian, 0 (0.0%) Pacific Islander, 45 (31.3%) from other races, and 1 (0.7%) from two or more races. Hispanic or Latino of any race were 54 persons (37.5%).

The Census reported that 144 people (100% of the population) lived in households, 0 (0%) lived in non-institutionalized group quarters, and 0 (0%) were institutionalized.

There were 53 households, out of which 23 (43.4%) had children under the age of 18 living in them, 27 (50.9%) were opposite-sex married couples living together, 5 (9.4%) had a female householder with no husband present, 2 (3.8%) had a male householder with no wife present. There were 2 (3.8%) unmarried opposite-sex partnerships, and 0 (0%) same-sex married couples or partnerships. 18 households (34.0%) were made up of individuals, and 9 (17.0%) had someone living alone who was 65 years of age or older. The average household size was 2.72. There were 34 families (64.2% of all households); the average family size was 3.59.

The population was spread out, with 38 people (26.4%) under the age of 18, 16 people (11.1%) aged 18 to 24, 18 people (12.5%) aged 25 to 44, 53 people (36.8%) aged 45 to 64, and 19 people (13.2%) who were 65 years of age or older. The median age was 45.0 years. For every 100 females, there were 75.6 males. For every 100 females age 18 and over, there were 86.0 males.

The homeowner vacancy rate was 0%; the rental vacancy rate was 46.7%. 92 people (63.9% of the population) lived in owner-occupied housing units and 52 people (36.1%) lived in rental housing units.

References 

Census-designated places in Santa Cruz County, California
Census-designated places in California